Michael Stigler (born May 4, 1992) is an American track and field athlete, specializing in hurdle races. In 2017, he finished second in the US Championship, behind Eric Futch, after running a personal best of 48.26 s in the 400 meters hurdles on June 25 in Sacramento.

References

External links

1992 births
Living people
American male hurdlers
World Athletics Championships athletes for the United States
Place of birth missing (living people)